Cabin Run is a tributary of the Tohickon Creek in Bucks County, Pennsylvania, rising in the southwestern portion of Bedminster Township to its confluence with the Tohickon Creek in northeastern Plumstead Township. Its course is approximately

History
Cabin Run was so named for the log cabins and stone homes that were built here in the 1700s, and appeared on maps as early as 1770. At one time the Leatherman grist, saw, and cider mill, and the Loux grist and saw mill were operated along the stream.
Cabin Run Covered Bridge and Loux Covered Bridge were added to the National Register of Historic Places on 1 December 1980.

Statistics
The GNIS I.D. number of Cabin Run is 1170857, Pennsylvania Department of Environmental Resources Code Number is 03116.

Course
The creek flows generally northeast and includes four unnamed tributaries.

Geology
Appalachian Highlands Division
Piedmont Province
Gettysburg-Newark Lowland Section
Brunswick Formation
Cabin Run lies within a narrow strip of the Brunswick Formation amongst a region of the Lockatong Formation. The Brunswick Formation consists of shale, mudstone, siltstone, green and brown shale. Mineralogy includes argillite and hornfels.

Crossings and Bridges

See also
List of rivers of the United States
List of rivers of Pennsylvania
List of Delaware River tributaries
Tohickon Creek

References

Rivers of Pennsylvania
Rivers of Bucks County, Pennsylvania
Tributaries of Tohickon Creek